Hy-Vee Hall is a convention center located in Des Moines, Iowa, United States. The convention center is a part of the Iowa Events Center.

History
While still incomplete, Hy-Vee Hall hosted its first event, the Autumn Festival, from October 21 through October 23, 2004. It was formally dedicated on December 15, 2004, while the Iowa Hall of Pride opened to the public on February 23, 2005.

Locally-based Midwest grocer chain Hy-Vee acquired the naming rights in a 20-year deal finalized in 2001.

Convention hall
The convention center features 100,000 square feet (9,000 m²) of space for trade shows, conventions, and other major events; with the connected Community Choice Credit Union Convention Center, the Hall offers 150,000 square feet of continuous space. It also features eight meeting rooms with a total of 15,000 square feet (1,400 m²) of meeting space. The south end of Hy-Vee Hall houses the Iowa Hall of Pride, which honors the achievements of Iowa high school athletes and performers. Surprisingly enough, Hy-Vee Hall is considered "Iowa's largest ballroom" with a capacity of up to 17,000.

Notable events
In 2008, Hy-Vee Hall hosted then-Senator Barack Obama's victory speech following the Iowa caucuses.

References

External links
Official site

Convention centers in Iowa
Buildings and structures in Des Moines, Iowa
Tourist attractions in Des Moines, Iowa
Hy-Vee